Brage is an offshore oil field in the North Sea located  northwest of the city of Bergen on the western coast of Norway and  east of Oseberg Field Center. The field also contains gas. The field was developed with a fixed integrated production, drilling and accommodation facility
The oil from the field is pumped through a pipeline to Oseberg A facility from where it is transported to Sture terminal via Oseberg Transport System. The gas from the field is exported through Statpipe system to Kårstø.

Ownership
The Brage field is operated by Wintershall Norge. Wintershall Norge holds 35.20%, Repsol Norge AS – 33.9%, Faroe Petroleum Norge – 14.30%, Point Resources – 12.2%, VNG Norge – 4.44%.

Production
Brage oil field produced up to  when it reached its peak production in 1998 and is currently producing . New wells were drilled in 2007 and the operator plans on drilling more wells in the near future. Production will probably to be shut down in 2020+

See also

Sture terminal
Oseberg Transport System
Oseberg oil field
North Sea oil
Economy of Norway

References

External links
Statoil official website

Equinor oil and gas fields
North Sea oil fields
Oil fields in Norway